Belgica is a Brussels Metro station on line 6. It is located in the municipality of Jette, in the north-west of Brussels, Belgium. It opened on 6 October 1982 and is named in honour of RV Belgica; the ship that carried the first Belgian polar expedition to the Antarctic in 1897.

References

External links

Brussels metro stations
Railway stations opened in 1982
Jette
1982 establishments in Belgium